Mbembe can be:
 Achille Mbembe, Cameroonian philosopher and political scientist
 Mbembe language, Cross-River language of Nigeria
 Tigon Mbembe language, Jukunoid language of Cameroon
 Mokele-Mbembe, water dwelling cryptid of the Congo basin